An eL15 ribosomal protein leader is  a  ribosomal protein leader involved in ribosome biogenesis. It is used as an autoregulatory mechanism to control the concentration of the ribosomal protein eL15, which is used in archaea and eukaryotes. Known Examples were predicted in Euryarchaeota with bioinformatic approaches. The structure is located in the 5′ untranslated regions of mRNAs encoding ribosomal proteins eL15 (rpl15e). Similarities between the eL15 ribosomal protein and the rRNA site to which this protein binds were detected.

References

External links 
 

Ribosomal protein leader